The Wedding Maidens is a 1990 Chinese drama film directed by Wang Jin. It was entered into the 17th Moscow International Film Festival where it won the Special Silver St. George.

Cast
 Chi Huaqiong as Jinmei
 Jin Di as Xin Liang
 Ju Xue as Hexiang
 Ning Li as Sibao
 Pu Chaoying as Wife of Hexiang's brother 
 Tao Huimin as Aiyue
 Wei Jian as Mingtao's father
 Wang Meihua as Guijuan's sister 
 Zhang Liwei as Stepmother

References

External links
 

1990 films
1990 drama films
Chinese drama films
Films based on Chinese novels
1990s Mandarin-language films